The Scapular of Saint Joseph is a Roman Catholic devotional scapular. The scapular is to remind one of the virtues of St Joseph which are humility, modesty and purity. It was approved for the Diocese of Verona by the Congregation of Rites in 1880.

History
On 15 April, 1898, Leo XIII granted to the General of the Capuchins the faculty of blessing and investing the faithful everywhere with this scapular. From the Diocese of St-Claude in France use of the scapular was spread by the Capuchins. There are no special conditions, even inscribing the names of its wearers.

Description
Due to the multiple sources for the scapular, the colors may be in combination, having white, gold and purple. The front of the scapular depicts Saint Joseph carrying the infant Jesus, and a lily in the other hand. The back panel features the Papal Arms, a dove (to symbolize the Holy Ghost) and a Cross.

Various indulgences have been granted for all the faithful who wear it by a Rescript of the Congregation for Indulgences, 8 June 1893.

See also
 Scapular
 Rosary and scapular

References

External links
 Scapular image 

Scapulars
Catholic devotions
Saint Joseph (husband of Mary)